The 2009 Campeonato Nacional de Apertura Copa Banco Estado was the 85th season of top-tier football in Chile. The tournament champion was Universidad de Chile, so that earned their 13th league title after a five-year winless, after winning over Unión Española on points, in the finals, that allowed the automatically qualification of the university team to the 2010 Copa Libertadores Second Stage.

After the relegations of Deportes Melipilla, Provincial Osorno and Deportes Concepción (because administration problems), the number of teams that contested the tournament was reduced from 20 to 18, following the promotion of Curicó Unido, which made their first top-flight appearance in 35 years.

It began on 31 January during a 2–2 draw between Curicó Unido and Colo-Colo at the Estadio Fiscal de Talca, and ended on 28 June.

Format changes
The format for 2009 remains largely the same as 2008, except for the advancement to the Playoff Stages. Groups will no longer be used to determine who advance to the next stage. Instead, the top-eight teams in Classification Stage will advance.

International qualification changes
Qualification to the Copa Libertadores remains the same, as well as qualification to the Chile 1 spot in the Copa Sudamericana. The Chile 2 spot will be contested between the second-best team in the first stage and the 2008-09 Copa Chile winner. The winner of the single match will qualify to the 2009 Copa Sudamericana.

Team information
The number of teams were reduced starting with this season from 20 to 18. Deportes Antofagasta, Provincial Osorno, Deportes Melipilla, and Deportes Concepción were relegated last season to the Primera B. They were replaced by Municipal Iquique and Curicó Unido.

Regular season

Standings

Results

Playoff stage

Updated as of games played on July 7, 2009.

Universidad de Chile qualified to the 2010 Copa Libertadores Second Stage.

Top goalscorers

Copa Sudamericana playoff
The second-best team of the Classification Stage (Universidad de Chile) played a match at Estadio Municipal Francisco Sánchez Rumoroso in the city of Coquimbo against the 2008 Copa Chile champions, (Universidad de Concepción) for the Chile 2 spot in the 2009 Copa Sudamericana.

Universidad de Chile classified to the Chile 2 berth for the 2009 Copa Sudamericana First Stage.

See also 
2009 in Chilean football
2009 Copa Chile

References

External links
ANFP 
2009 Torneo Apertura at Soccerway
Season regulations 
 RSSSF Chile 2009

Primera División de Chile seasons
Chile
Prim